In enzymology, a branched-chain-fatty-acid kinase is an enzyme that catalyzes the chemical reaction

ATP + 2-methylpropanoate  ADP + 2-methylpropanoyl phosphate

Thus, the two substrates of this enzyme are ATP and 2-methylpropanoate, whereas its two products are ADP and 2-methylpropanoyl phosphate.

This enzyme belongs to the family of transferases, specifically those transferring phosphorus-containing groups (phosphotransferases) with a carboxy group as acceptor.  The systematic name of this enzyme class is ATP:branched-chain-fatty-acid 1-phosphotransferase. This enzyme is also called isobutyrate kinase.

References

 

EC 2.7.2
Enzymes of unknown structure